The 2022 Indonesia Masters Super 100 (officially known as the KB Financial Group Indonesia Masters 2022 for sponsorship reasons) was a badminton tournament which took place at Platinum Sports Hall in Malang, Indonesia, from 18 to 23 October 2022 and had a total purse of $81,000.

Tournament 
The 2022 Indonesia Masters Super 100 was the fifth and final Super 100 tournament of the 2022 BWF World Tour and also part of the Indonesia Masters Super 100 championships, which had been held since 2018. This tournament was organized by the Badminton Association of Indonesia and sanctioned by the BWF.

Venue 
This international tournament was held at Platinum Sports Hall in Malang, East Java, Indonesia.

Point distribution 
Below is the point distribution table for each phase of the tournament based on the BWF points system for the BWF Tour Super 100 event.

Prize pool 
The total prize money was US$81,000 with the distribution of the prize money in accordance with BWF regulations.

Men's singles

Seeds 

 Ng Tze Yong (quarter-finals)
 Koki Watanabe (third round)
 Parupalli Kashyap (withdrew)
 Weng Hongyang (quarter-finals)
 Son Wan-ho (semi-finals)
 Soong Joo Ven (withdrew)
 Cheam June Wei (final)
 Subhankar Dey (second round)

Finals

Top half

Section 1

Section 2

Bottom half

Section 3

Section 4

Women's singles

Seeds 

 Saena Kawakami (quarter-finals)
 Putri Kusuma Wardani (second round)
 Sim Yu-jin (second round)
 Ruselli Hartawan (quarter-finals)
 Kisona Selvaduray (quarter-finals)
 Soniia Cheah Su Ya (first round)
 Goh Jin Wei (first round)
 Wenyu Zhang (first round)

Finals

Top half

Section 1

Section 2

Bottom half

Section 3

Section 4

Men's doubles

Seeds 

 He Jiting / Zhou Haodong (final)
 Junaidi Arif / Muhammad Haikal (quarter-finals)
 Hiroki Okamura / Masayuki Onodera (semi-finals)
 Ren Xiangyu / Tan Qiang (semi-finals)
 Rahmat Hidayat / Pramudya Kusumawardana (champions)
 Takuto Inoue / Kenya Mitsuhashi (quarter-finals)
 Boon Xin Yuan / Wong Tien Ci (second round)
 Panjer Aji Siloka Dadiara / Bryan Sidney Elohim (first round)

Finals

Top half

Section 1

Section 2

Bottom half

Section 3

Section 4

Women's doubles

Seeds 

 Rui Hirokami / Yuna Kato (champions)
 Pichamon Phatcharaphisutsin / Nannapas Sukklad (second round)
 Kim Min-ji / Seong Seung-yeon (semi-finals)
 Sayaka Hobara / Hinata Suzuki (quarter-finals)
 Rena Miyaura / Ayako Sakuramoto (final)
 Lanny Tria Mayasari / Ribka Sugiarto (quarter-finals)
 Nita Violina Marwah / Tryola Nadia (quarter-finals)
 Fitriani / Jesica Moeljati (second round)

Finals

Top half

Section 1

Section 2

Bottom half

Section 3

Section 4

Mixed doubles

Seeds 

 Yujiro Nishikawa / Saori Ozaki (quarter-finals)
 Dejan Ferdinansyah / Gloria Emanuelle Widjaja (semi-finals)
 Na Sung-seung / Kim Min-ji (second round)
 Akbar Bintang Cahyono / Marsheilla Gischa Islami (quarter-finals)
 Hafiz Faizal / Melati Daeva Oktavianti (quarter-finals)
 Amri Syahnawi / Winny Oktavina Kandow (quarter-finals)
 Adnan Maulana / Nita Violina Marwah (second round)
 Tan Ming Kang /  Serena Kani (second round)

Finals

Top half

Section 1

Section 2

Bottom half

Section 3

Section 4

References

External link 
Tournament link

Indonesia Masters Super 100
Indonesia Masters Super 100
Indonesia Masters Super 100
Indonesia Masters Super 100